Héctor Andrés Acosta Di Gregorio (17 July 2000) is a Venezuelan footballer who plays as a defender for Charlotte Independence in the USL League One.

Career

Charlotte Independence
On 15 February 2022, Acosta signed with USL League One club Charlotte Independence.

References

2000 births
Living people
Venezuelan footballers
Association football defenders
Charlotte Independence players
Expatriate soccer players in the United States
Venezuelan Primera División players
USL League One players
Venezuelan expatriate footballers
Venezuelan expatriate sportspeople in the United States